Poundley and Walker or John Wilkes Poundley and David Walker were a land surveyors and architects’ partnership with offices at Black Hall, Kerry, Montgomeryshire and at Unity Buildings, 22 Lord Street, Liverpool. The partnership was established probably in the mid-1850s and was dissolved in June 1867. The partnership was involved with large country estate building projects, church and civic buildings and some civil engineering. They specialized in building model farms. J. W. Poundley was also the county surveyor for Montgomeryshire from 1861–1872. The architect, canal and railway engineer, T. G. Newnham (sometimes incorrectly given as T. G. Newenham) appears have been associated with the partnership.

John Wilkes Poundley (1807–1872) 
Poundley was baptized at Montgomery, 27 April 1807. Following the death of his father, he was taken into the guardianship of William Pugh of Caerhowel and in 1827 he was apprenticed to the Oswestry architect Thomas Penson. He never qualified as an architect. In 1857 Poundley published Poundley's Cottage Architecture.

Poundley had close connections with Naylor family who, in 1835, had acquired the Brynllywarch estates at Kerry from William Pugh, the son of his guardian. They were also to acquire other estates at Leighton and Nantcribba. He was employed to undertake survey work of these acquisitions, now bound in two atlas volumes in the National Library of Wales. The Leighton Estate was purchased in 1847 and Poundley was employed on the construction of the monumental model farm from about 1849 to 1860. Apart from the farm itself, some of the more important structures are the Poultry House and the "cottage orneé", Poultry Cottage, the Cable House of the Railway and the massive stone built slurry tank, for the effluent from the farm.

About 1850 Poundley moved from Brook Cottage in Kerry to Black Hall. In the 1860s until the partnership with David Walker was dissolved, their output was prodigious and included considerable quantities of estate housing. The work extended to David Davies's Llandinam estate, the Abbeycwmhir estate in Radnorshire and model farms for the Earl of Cawdor in Carmarthenshire and Pembrokeshire. It is difficult to judge to what extent Poundley actually designed buildings, but the decorative bargeboards on cottage orneé buildings as at Glanmule seems to represent his work, as well as the use of red brick with rusticated stone quoining. Poundley was the main promoter of the Abermule to Kerry Railway, which had been authorized as part of the Oswestry and Newtown Railway Act of 1855. This came into effect in May 1861 following the opening of Abermule Station. The construction of the railway and the building of Kerry Station at Glanmule appears to have been supervised by Poundley, opening on 2 May 1864. The railway amalgamated with others to form the Cambrian Railways in July 1864.
 
Poundley was also a sheep farmer and it was largely through his efforts the Kerry Sheep breed came to be recognized

Poundley’s Cottage Architecture 1857

This was produced for a group of Denbighshire Gentlemen under the sponsorship of Lord Bagot, of Pool Park near Denbigh and of  Blithfield in Staffordshire.  The double cottage design produced by Poundley is very plain and  lacks the decorative features seen on his work for the Naylor's Montgomeryshire estates. Poundley states that he had built 25 of these cottages in the past year and the cost would have been £250 for a double cottage.  The plans for the farm buildings for a 200-acre farm are similar to the farm buildings he erected for the Naylors at Leighton and Kerry, but on a smaller scale. The farm buildings would have cost £1000. For a farm of 100 acres the cost would have been £790. He also published plans for a simple double cottage of Bungalow form which would have cost £180 and the walls of which were supported on an iron framing.

David Walker (1840–1892)

David Walker was a pupil of the architects William Hardy Hay and James Murdoch Hay in Liverpool. He was born in Birkenhead. He was practising at Unity Buildings Lord Street Liverpool in 1868 and had moved to Dale Street, Liverpool in 1881. He was still practising in 1890 and possibly up to his death, if he re-fronted the Bear Inn in Newtown in 1892. He particularly favoured whitish/yellow brick for his work and favoured rounded arched braced gables drawn from the writings of Eugène Viollet-le-Duc In later life Walker appears to have specialised in Church architecture and developed an interest an interest in church wood, writing articles on church screens and rood lofts. He restored the screen at Llanwnnog in Montgomeryshire in 1873 and re-built in 1877-8 the church at Llananno in Radnorshire, to house the medieval screen.

T G Newnham (1809/10–1898)

Thomas Garrett Newnham was the engineer to the Western Branch of the Montgomeryshire Canal in the 1830s and was a close associate of William Pugh, of Brynllywarch. In 1834 he was admitted as a member of the Institution of Civil Engineers and in 1836 he subscribed to Augustus Pugin’s Examples of Gothic Architecture, where he is described as an ‘Architect’ and his address is given as Newtown. He was involved in promoting an alternative route, on behalf of the now bankrupt William Pugh for the London to Holyhead Railway, in competition with Brunel and Stephenson. His model of Dolfor church was exhibited at The Great Exhibition of 1851. At about this time he left for India to become Chief Resident Engineer of the Sindh Railway and was responsible for St Andrew's Church, Karachi, which was completed in 1867. Later in the 1870s Newnham became deputy agent of Indus Flotilla, a steamship company

Works by Poundley and Walker

Public Buildings

Ruthin Town Hall, Denbighshire, 1863-5.
Llanidloes Magistrates Court and Lock-up 1864
Llanfair Caereinion Police Station/Lock up 1869
Montgomery Gaol Gatehouse (former).

Schools
Kerry School 1886. A whitish yellow brick is used and the large schoolroom was lit with a tall gothic window and adjacent to which is a tower surmounted with a louvered belfry (as on the parish church) with a spire on-top. The composition is more ecclesiastical than scholastic. When the County Architect, Herbert Carr came to extend the school c.1952 he careful matched the brickwork and added stone rustication that matched that on the earlier building.
Llanidloes. former National School (Glandwr School), Gorn Road. Attributed. Typical arched braced gables and yellow brick.

Houses 
Broneirion, Llandinam, Montgomeryshire 1864.
Broneirion Lodge, Llandinam, Montgomeryshire 1864.
Abbeycwmhir Hall, Radnorshire 1866/8
 Abbeycwmhir Keeper’s Cottage. 
 Dolforwyn, Castell Forwyn Abermule. 1866., Montgomeryshire
Nantclwyd Hall, Llanelidan, Denbighshire. 1850 House by James Kellaway Colling greatly expanded by David Walker, probably after 1864.

Churches
Carno, Montgomeryshire 1862–67.
Abbeycwmhir Radnorshire
Darowen, Montgomeryshire 1862-4
Llanbedr Dyffryn Clwyd
Llanwyddelan, Montgomeryshire (attributed)
St Peter’s, Machynlleth, Montgomeryshire. Altered by Poundley and Walker in 1864.
St Michael, Trefeglwys, Montgomeryshire 
St John, Trefolwern, Llanbrynmair, Montgomeryshire 1866–1874. The church is now ruined.

Leighton Hall Estate

Model Farm c1839-60
Poultry House 1861. Now restored by the Landmark Trust
Poultry Cottage
Slurry Enclosure
Cilcewydd Mill, a sawmill for the Leighton Estates.
Cilcewydd Semi-detached double villa c.1863. Yellow brick with two arch braced gables

Nantcribba Estate
Nantcribba Hall. Alterations to the frontage made by Poundley and Walker. 
Model Farm 1874 (?completion)
Nantcribba Farmhouse c1865
Workers Cottages. Red brick 
Gatehouse. Yellow brick, single storey.

Brynllywarch Estate, Kerry

Extensive estate housing with typical red brick and stone rusticated quoining. An unusual composition by Poundley and Walker was a terrace of houses built for Naylor next to the former Kerry workhouse. The red bricks are punctuated by a double string of white brick and a pattern of white and black bricks below the eaves and for the upper voussoirs. The use of curved bricks in the voussiors give the impression of a pharonic head-dress.
Sawmills
Glanmule Cottage
Upper Pengelli. A small holding designed as a model farm.

Other work in Kerry
The Old Schoolhouse (by Kerry Church). Alterations by Poundley 1848.
Reading Room and former Police house 1856, probably by Poundley. 
The National School. Whitish yellow brick and the large schoolroom was lit with a tall gothic window. adjacent to which is a tower surmounted with a louvered belfry (as on the parish church) with a spire on-top. More ecclesiastical than scholastic. When the County Architect, Herbert Carr came to extend the school in about 1952 he careful matched the brickwork and added stone rustication that matched that on the earlier building.

Earl of Cawdor’s Cardigan and Pembroke Estates: Model Farms
Cenarth, Gelligatti.
St Ismael’s Tanyllan
Stackpole, Pembrokeshire. Rowston.

Bridges
Broniarth Meifod 1862. Over the River Banwy. Metal carriageway by Woodall of Dudley.
Rhydlydan, between Llanwnog and Aberhafesp,

Railways and Roads

Kerry Station – typical Poundley ornate bargeboards
As county surveyor, Poundley is likely to have been involved in various road building improvement schemes and he ‘engineered the new road from the Pentre in Kerry to the Anchor.

Works by David Walker
Works which were completely after the dissolution of the partnership with Poundley in 1867.

Public Buildings
Welshpool, former Powysland Museum, 1874
Newtown, The Market Hall, 1870. At one point, the front of the building was covered by a fake facade. It has since been removed to show the original building
Newtown, former Police Station, Back Lane 1870

School
Trefeglwys. Former School 1872. Attributed. The characteristically carved bargeboards would support an attribution to Walker. The Master’s house was on the left and the projecting gabled lobbied entrance has gothic windows with decorative yellow brick dressing.

Churches

Beaumont, St. Mary (1887–1889)   Cumberland
Birkenhead, St. Peter (1866–1868)
Great Sutton, St John the Evangelist, 1878–82.
Gwernaffield, Holy Trinity (1871–1872)   Flintshire.
St Anno's Church, Llananno, Radnorshire. Rebuilt church in 1877-8.
Rhyl, St. John the Baptist (1884–1890)   Flintshire.
West Derby, St. Nathaniel (1868–1869)   Lancashire
 Newtown St David’s. Replaced Thomas Penson’s apse.

Works by T G Newnham
Dolfor, St. Paul, (1837–1852)   Montgomeryshire. St David’s Diocese 
Llanmerewig, St. Llwchaiarn (1838–1840)   Montgomeryshire

References

Literature
Antonia Brodie (ed) Directory of British Architects, 1834–1914: 2 Vols, British Architectural Library, Royal Institute of British Architects, 2001
Cozens L et al. The Mawddwy, Van and Kerry Branches. Oakwood Press, 2nd ed, 2004
Hubbard E (1986).  The Buildings of Wales: Clwyd (Denbighshire and Flintshire), Penguin/Yale.
R Scourfield and R Haslam (2013), The Buildings of Wales: Powys; Montgomeryshire, Radnorshire and Breconshire Yale University Press .

Poundley and Walker Gallery

British bridge engineers
Architecture firms of Wales
History of Montgomeryshire
Kerry